Michael John Richardson (born 16 March 1959) is a former Australian rules football player who played for the Collingwood Football Club, Essendon Football Club and the Brisbane Bears in the AFL and Swan Districts Football Club and West Perth Football Club in the WAFL throughout the late 1970s and early 1990s.

Early career
Richardson began his career at Swan Districts in 1978 at an age of 19, he was regarded as a highly skilled fast placed roving forward or mid fielder.
Richardson played as a rover in the 1982 Grand Final and was among the team's best players. He also topped the goal kicking list at Swan Districts that season with 75 goals.

VFL/AFL career 
He was recruited to Collingwood Football Club in 1983 and played a total of 60 games, kicking 117 goals, before leaving midway through the 1986 season to play for the Essendon football club. He remained at Essendon for the remainder of the 1986 season playing 15 games and kicking 14 goals.
Richardson then joined the inaugural Brisbane Bears Team in the 1987 season he played some of his best football at the club and held down many positions. He left at the end of the 1990 season after playing 81 games and kicking 43 goals to return to Swan Districts.

WAFL
He played another two seasons at Swans before leaving to play with West Perth for the 1994 season to bring up his 300th game. Richardson played a total of 141 games and kicked 220 goals for Swans throughout his career.
During his career he played over 300 games and kicked 439 goals.
He is selected in the Swan Districts Team of the Century on a half-forward flank.

Personal life
He is the twin brother of former Essendon and WAFL player Stephen Richardson.

References

External links
Mike Richardson player profile page at WAFL FootyFacts

Swan Districts Football Club players
Collingwood Football Club players
Essendon Football Club players
Brisbane Bears players
All-Australians (1953–1988)
Living people
1959 births
Australian rules footballers from Western Australia
West Perth Football Club players
Australian twins
Twin sportspeople
Western Australian State of Origin players
Australia international rules football team players